MLS on TSN is the branding used for TSN's telecasts of Major League Soccer matches. TSN first acquired rights to MLS in 2011.

History
In February 2011, CTVglobemedia announced a six-year deal for national MLS broadcast rights in Canada. TSN and TSN2 would broadcast 24 matches during the 2011 season and air a minimum of 30 matches per season during the subsequent five seasons, all featuring at least one Canadian team. French-language sister networks RDS and RDS2 had similar broadcast rights. The networks also carried the MLS Cup and select playoff matches, the MLS All-Star Game, and additional matches not involving Canadian teams. GolTV continued to carry selected all-U.S. MLS matches.

Toronto FC regional matches were split between TSN and the Sportsnet networks (their parent companies, Rogers Communications and Bell Canada, jointly own a stake in TFC's parent company Maple Leaf Sports & Entertainment). In 2014, TSN acquired rights to Vancouver Whitecaps FC regional matches.

In 2017, Bell Media reached a five-year extension to its English-language rights to Major League Soccer, with coverage remaining similar to previous seasons (though with French-language rights moving to rival network TVA Sports, and the option for matches to be simulcast on broadcast network CTV). TSN also assumed exclusive rights to Toronto FC.

On December 15, 2021, MLS announced that it would be continuing with the same Canadian broadcasters for 2022. TSN will broadcast all Toronto FC and Vancouver Whitecaps games while TVA Sports will cover CF Montréal in French. TSN will also broadcast select additional matches and CTV will show eight MLS games.

TSN acquired national rights to select MLS games for the 2023–2026 seasons. TSN will broadcast at least one match per week featuring a Canadian team, eight playoff matches, and the MLS Cup Final. Matches aired on TSN are non-exclusive and will also be available in Canada on MLS Season Pass.

Commentators

Luke Wileman (host and play-by-play)
Kristian Jack (host and TSN soccer analyst)
Steven Caldwell (TSN soccer analyst)
Terry Dunfield (TSN soccer analyst)
Gareth Wheeler (TSN soccer radio host)
Blake Price (play-by-play)
Paul Dolan (TSN soccer analyst)
Joey Alfieri (play-by-play)
Vic Rauter (play-by-play)
Greg Sutton (TSN soccer analyst)

References

See also
Soccer on Canadian television

TSN
The Sports Network original programming
2011 Canadian television series debuts
2010s Canadian sports television series
2020s Canadian sports television series